The Museum of Greek Folk Musical Instruments, is a museum and  Research Centre for Ethnomusicology in the Lassanis Mansion, Plaka, Athens, Greece. It displays about 600 Greek musical instruments from the last 300 years and has as many more in store.

Collection
The collection includes:

 Lyres
 Flogheras
 Defia
 Gaides
 Koudounia
 Laghouta
 Bouzoukia
 Souravlia
 Zournades
 Lalitsas
 Toubelekia
 Cretan lyras

Gallery

See also 
 List of music museums

External links
Hellenic Ministry of Culture and Tourism
www.greece-museums.com

Museums in Athens
Popular
Music organizations based in Greece